Norman Paraisy (born January 7, 1986) is a French mixed martial artist. He competes in the middleweight division and is the 6th ranked of 171 active Europe Western Pro Light Heavyweights. He is known for being a contestant on The Ultimate Fighter 11 and 23. Paraisy also competed in the Bellator Fighting Championships: Season One as a welterweight and also competed in Bellator Fighting Championships: Season Six and Bellator Fighting Championships: Season Eight as a middleweight. He held the PFC SHC and FMC belt and was a contender for the CWFC belt.

Mixed martial arts career

Early career
Paraisy made his pro debut on April 11, 2006, against Paulo Santos. he won via rear-naked choke in the 2nd round. Paraisy then won his next three fights before having a No Contest against Hiroki Ozaki at GCM: Cage Force EX Eastern Bound.

In his next fight, Paraisy took on former DEEP Welterweight Champion Hidehiko Hasegawa. He won via majority decision.

Bellator MMA
Paraisy made his Bellator debut in the first welterweight tournament against former UFC Middleweight Champion Dave Menne. He lost via submission in the third round, the first loss of his career.

On September 14, 2011, it was announced that Bellator had signed Paraisy and that he would compete in the Season Six middleweight tournament.

In the opening round of the tournament Paraisy took on former UFC vet Maiquel Falcão. He lost via unanimous decision.

Paraisy's next fight in Bellator was in the Season Eight middleweight tournament against Brett Cooper. He lost via unanimous decision.

The Ultimate Fighter 11: Team Liddell vs. Team Ortiz
Paraisy was seen in the very first episode of The Ultimate Fighter 11. Norman took on James Hammortree in the elimination bout to see which fight gets into the house. At the end of round one Paraisy was unable to answer the bell Hammortree was declared the winner.

Post TUF 11
After Paraisy fought on the Ultimate Fighter and sent home, Norman took on Jason Muldoon at FH - Fight Club 4. He won via Submission.

He then took on Shaun Lomas. He won via submission.

In his next fight, he took Giullaume Piquet at FMC - Fighting Marcou Challenge 4. He won via TKO and capture the middleweight title.

Paraisy had a draw in his next fight against Michele Verginelli on April 30, 2011.

On May 20, 2011, Paraisy took on former PRIDE superstar Paulo Filho at X-Combat Ultra - International Grand Prix. He won via unanimous decision.

Paraisy took on Jack Mason in his next fight. He won via TKO.

For Paraisy's next fight he took on Manuel Garcia at PFC 5 - Clash of the Titans, for the middleweight title. He won via TKO.

Paraisy is expected to take on Chris Fields at CWFC 55 - Cage Warriors Fighting Championship 55 which is headlined by former UFC vet Che Mills. The fight ended in a majority draw.

He won the SHC belt in Switzerland in 2013 defeating his opponent after 3 rounds of ground and pound.

After defeating Allan Love at Cage Warriors Fight Night 10 in Jordan, he fought Jack Hermansson for CWFC middleweight title at CWFC 69 - Super Saturday, in London.

Mixed martial arts record

|-
| Loss
| align=center| 14–6–2 (1)
| Alan Carlos
| Decision (unanimous)
| Cage Warriors 93
| 
| align=center| 3
| align=center| 5:00
| Gothenburg, Sweden
| 
|-
| Loss
| align=center| 14–5–2 (1)
| Kenneth Bergh
| Submission (guillotine choke)
| Cage Warriors 84
| 
| align=center| 2
| align=center| 2:13
| London, England
| Light Heavyweight bout
|-
| Loss
| align=center| 14–4–2 (1)
| Jack Hermansson
| Submission (rear-naked choke)
| Cage Warriors 69
| 
| align=center| 4
| align=center| 4:49
| London, England
| <small>For the Vacant Cage Warriors Middleweight Championship
|-
| Win
| align=center| 14–3–2 (1)
| Allan Love
| Decision (unanimous)
| Cage Warriors: Fight Night 10
| 
| align=center| 3
| align=center| 5:00
| Amman, Jordan
| 
|-
| Win
| align=center| 13–3–2 (1)
| Boubacar Balde
| Decision (unanimous)
| Strength and Honor Championship 8
| 
| align=center| 3
| align=center| 5:00
| Geneva, Switzerland 
| 
|-
| Win
| align=center| 12–3–2 (1)
| Leeroy Barnes
| Decision (unanimous)
|  Cage Warriors 57
| 
| align=center| 3
| align=center| 5:00
| Liverpool, England UK
| 
|-
| Draw
| align=center| 11–3–2 (1)
| Chris Fields
| Draw (majority)
|  Cage Warriors 55
| 
| align=center| 3
| align=center| 5:00
| Dublin, Ireland
| <small>Catchweight (190 lbs) bout
|-
| Win
| align=center| 11–3–1 (1) 
| Manuel Garcia
| TKO (kicks)
| PFC 5 - Clash of the Titans
| 
| align=center| 1
| align=center| 2:15
| Marseille, France
| 
|-
| Loss
| align=center| 10–3–1 (1)
| Brett Cooper
| Decision (unanimous)
| Bellator 89
| 
| align=center| 3
| align=center| 5:00
| Charlotte, North Carolina, United States
| <small> Bellator Season 8 Middleweight Tournament Quarterfinal
|-
|-
| Loss
| align=center| 10–2–1 (1)
| Maiquel Falcão
| Decision (unanimous)
| Bellator 61
| 
| align=center| 3
| align=center| 5:00
| Bossier City, Louisiana, United States
| <small> Bellator Season 6 Middleweight Tournament Quarterfinal
|-
| Win
| align=center| 10–1–1 (1)
| Jack Mason
| TKO (flying knee and elbows)
| Cage Warriors: 43
| 
| align=center| 3
| align=center| 3:50
| Kentish Town, North London, England
| 
|-
| Win
| align=center| 9–1–1 (1)
| Paulo Filho
| Decision (unanimous)
| X-Combat Ultra: International Grand Prix
| 
| align=center| 3
| align=center| 5:00
| Campos dos Goytacazes, Rio de Janeiro, Brazil
| 
|-
| Draw
| align=center| 8–1–1 (1) 
| Michele Verginelli
| Draw
| Strength and Honor Championship 4: Monson vs. Perak
| 
| align=center| 3
| align=center| 5:00
| Geneva, Switzerland
| 
|-
| Win
| align=center| 8–1 (1) 
| Giullaume Piquet
| TKO (punches)
| Fighting Marcou Challenge 4
| 
| align=center| 3
| align=center| N/A
| Palavas-les-Flots, Herault, France
| 
|-
| Win
| align=center| 7–1 (1)
| Shaun Lomas
| Submission (arm-triangle choke)
| Shoot & Sprawl 2
| 
| align=center| 1
| align=center| 3:11
| Northampton, Northamptonshire, England
| 
|-
| Win
| align=center| 6–1 (1) 
| Jason Muldoon
| Submission (arm-triangle choke)
| Fighters Hive: Fight Club 4
| 
| align=center| 1
| align=center| N/A
| Bathgate, West Lothian, Scotland
| 
|-
| Loss
| align=center| 5–1 (1)
| Dave Menne
| Submission (rear-naked choke)
| Bellator IV
| 
| align=center| 3
| align=center| 2:39
| Norman, Oklahoma, United States
| 
|-
| Win
| align=center| 5–0 (1)
| Hidehiko Hasegawa
| Decision (majority)
| M-1 Challenge 6: Korea
| 
| align=center| 2
| align=center| 5:00
| South Korea
| 
|-
| NC
| align=center| 4–0 (1) 
| Hiroki Ozaki
| No contest (overturned)
| Greatest Common Multiple: Cage Force EX Eastern Bound
| 
| align=center| 2
| align=center| 0:37
| Tokyo, Japan
| <small> Originally a submission win for Ozaki, but later changed to a no contest.
|-
| Win
| align=center| 4–0 
| Dave Radford
| Submission (choke)
| Ultimate Force 6: Battle of Waterloo
| 
| align=center| 1
| align=center| 4:53
| England
| 
|-
| Win
| align=center| 3–0 
| Edgar Pilrimis
| Submission (rear-naked choke)
| Intense Fighting: Caged
| 
| align=center| 1
| align=center| 2:46
| England
| 
|-
| Win
| align=center| 2–0 
| Rustam Kuraev
| Decision (split)
| M-1 MFC: Mix-Fight
| 
| align=center| 3
| align=center| 5:00
| Russia
| 
|-
| Win
| align=center| 1–0 
| Paulo Santos
| Submission (rear-naked choke)
| Minotauro Fights 3
| 
| align=center| 2
| align=center| N/A
| Salvador, Bahia, Brazil
| 
|-

Mixed martial arts exhibition record

|-
| Loss
| align=center| 0–2
| Elias Urbina 
| Decision (unanimous)
| The Ultimate Fighter: Team Joanna vs. Team Cláudia
| 
| align=center| 3
| align=center| 5:00
| Las Vegas, Nevada, United States
| 
|-
| Loss
| align=center| 0–1
| James Hammortree
| TKO (quit)
| The Ultimate Fighter: Team Liddell vs. Team Ortiz
| 
| align=center| 1
| align=center| 5:00
| Las Vegas, Nevada, United States
|

References

1986 births
Living people
Sportspeople from Paris
French male mixed martial artists
Middleweight mixed martial artists